The Royal Thousand is the sole studio album by the metalcore band Glass Cloud. The album was recorded in late 2011 at Lambesis Studios, in Escondido, California and was released on July 10, 2012.

The album was produced by Joshua Travis, and mixed and mastered by Will Putney at The Machine Shop in Weehawken, New Jersey.

Track listing

Personnel
Glass Cloud
Jerry Roush - vocals
Joshua Travis – guitar
Travis Sykes – bass, backing vocals, lyrics
Chad Hasty – drums

Production
Joshua Travis - producer
Will Putney - mixing, mastering

Additional Personnel
Evan Leake - artwork
Corinne Alexandra - additional photography

References

2012 albums
Glass Cloud albums
Equal Vision Records albums